Tim Wollthan  (born 29 April 1980) is a German male water polo player. He was a member of the Germany men's national water polo team, playing as a centre back. He was a part of the  team at the 2004 Summer Olympics. On club level he played for SV Bayer Uerdingen 08 in Germany.

References

1980 births
Living people
German male water polo players
Water polo players at the 2004 Summer Olympics
Olympic water polo players of Germany
Sportspeople from Krefeld